Zhang Meiying (born January 1944) is a Chinese politician, who served as the vice chairperson of the Chinese People's Political Consultative Conference.

References 

1944 births
Living people
Vice Chairpersons of the National Committee of the Chinese People's Political Consultative Conference
All-China Women's Federation people